"Longfellow Serenade" is the title of a 1974 song by the American singer-songwriter Neil Diamond. It was written by Diamond, produced by Tom Catalano, and included on Diamond's album Serenade.

"Longfellow Serenade" spent two weeks at No. 5 on the Billboard Hot 100 chart in November 1974. It was Diamond's second No. 1 on the Billboard Easy Listening chart, following his 1972 single, "Song Sung Blue". The song reached No. 1 in Switzerland and No. 2 in Germany.

Diamond described "Longfellow Serenade" in the liner notes to his 1996 compilation album, In My Lifetime: "Occasionally I like using a particular lyrical style which, in this case, lent itself naturally to telling the story of a guy who woos his woman with poetry." The title of the song is a reference to the 19th-century American poet Henry Wadsworth Longfellow. Diamond chose to reference Longfellow specifically after recalling an instance in which, while in his teens, Diamond had used one of the poet's works to successfully seduce a significantly older woman.

Cash Box called it a "powerful up-tempo ballad" saying that "Neil handles the tune with his usual expertise and rich smooth vocal." Record World said that Diamond "invokes a classic 19th century bard and turns in a true masterpiece of thought and performance perfection."

Chart history

Weekly charts

Year-end charts

Cover versions
Petr Spálený – Velký Muž Serenád

See also
List of number-one adult contemporary singles of 1974 (U.S.)

References

External links
Single release info from discogs.com Retrieved February 10, 2009.
 

1970s ballads
1974 singles
Neil Diamond songs
Songs written by Neil Diamond
1974 songs
Columbia Records singles
Number-one singles in South Africa
Song recordings produced by Tom Catalano
Rock ballads